The 1971 Amateur World Series was the 19th Amateur World Series (AWS), an international men's amateur baseball tournament. The tournament was sanctioned by the International Baseball Federation (which titled it the Baseball World Cup as of the 1988 tournament). The tournament took place, for the seventh time, in Cuba, and was won by the host Cuba national baseball team, their 11th title. They finished with an undefeated record of 9–0, recording six shutouts and scoring 60 runs while allowing only four.

There were 10 participating countries. The United States declined to take part in the tournament.

Colombia notably protested that the Mexican team illegally used three professional players. Mexico were later stripped of several victories, dropping them to ninth place in the standings.

Final standings

References

External links
World Cup Cuba  

World Cup
Baseball World Cup
1971
1